Athymhormic syndrome (from Ancient Greek θυμός thūmós, "mood" or "affect", and hormḗ, "impulse", "drive" or "appetite"), psychic akinesia, or auto-activation deficit (AAD) is a rare psychopathological and neurological syndrome characterized by extreme passivity, apathy, blunted affect and a profound generalized loss of self-motivation and conscious thought. For example, a patient spent 45 minutes with his hands on a lawn mower, totally unable to initiate the act of mowing. This “kinetic blockade” disappeared instantaneously when his son told him to move. The existence of such symptoms in patients after damage to certain structures in the brain has been used in support of a physical model of motivation in human beings, wherein the limbic loop of the basal ganglia is the initiator of directed action and thought.

First described by French neurologist Dominique Laplane in 1982 as "PAP syndrome" (or "loss of psychic autoactivation"), the syndrome is believed to be due to damage to areas of the basal ganglia or frontal cortex, specifically the striatum and globus pallidus, responsible for motivation and executive functions. It may occur without any preexisting psychiatric condition.

Symptoms
It is characterized by an absence of voluntary motion without any apparent motor deficit, and patients often describe a complete mental void or blank. This is accompanied by reduced affect or emotional concern (athymhormy) and often by compulsions, repetitive actions, or tics. After stimulation from the outside, such as a direct command, the patient is able to move normally and carry out complex physical and mental tasks for as long as they are prompted to continue.

The symptoms may be differentiated from depression because depression requires the existence of sadness or negative thoughts, while athymhormic patients claim to have complete lack of thoughts, positive or negative.

Diagnosis

See also
 Aboulia
 Akinetic mutism
 Athymhormia
 Huntington's disease
 Progressive supranuclear palsy

References

Symptoms and signs of mental disorders
Psychopathological syndromes